Andreas Ivanschitz (born 15 October 1983) is an Austrian retired footballer who played as an attacking midfielder.

During the career, Ivanschitz played for Rapid Wien, Red Bull Salzburg, Panathinaikos, 1.FSV Mainz 05, Levante, Seattle Sounders FC and Viktoria Plzen.

A full international since 2003, he represented Austria at Euro 2008.

Club career
Born in Eisenstadt, Ivanschitz began his football career as a youth in his town's local team called ASK Baumgarten, where he spent nine years. Soon, Rapid Wien scouts found out about his talent and in 1998, he signed his first professional contract with the Austrian champions. He was only 16 years old when he wore his team's shirt during an Austrian Cup match against Ranshofen on 26 October 1999. His first official League match was in 2000 against Wüstenrot Salzburg. In 177 games for Rapid Wien, Ivanschitz scored 27 times, winning the Austrian Championship title in 2004–05. In 2003, he was elected "Austrian Footballer of the Year."

In January 2006, Ivanschitz transferred to Red Bull Salzburg and then to Greek Super League club Panathinaikos in August 2006 on a two-year loan. On 20 June 2008, Ivanschitz agreed on a permanent deal with Panathinaikos.

After three years in Greece with Panathinaikos he agreed on 18 July 2009 on a two-year loan with 1. FSV Mainz 05 with the view to a two-year permanent contract in the summer of 2011. Mainz took advantage of this contract option prematurely, and signed Ivanschitz permanently in January 2011.

On 10 June 2013, Ivanschitz left Mainz for Levante UD. He scored his first goal in La Liga on 31 August, the winner with the last kick of a 2–1 home win over Rayo Vallecano. He finished his first season in Spain with three goals from 29 games, the last being in a 2–0 win over city rivals Valencia CF on 10 May.

On 4 August 2015, he signed with Seattle Sounders FC in Major League Soccer. After suffering from an injury his debut was postponed to 13 September where he assisted a late Obafemi Martins goal to tie up the game against San Jose Earthquakes. Ivanschitz converted Seattle's second kick from the spot in the 2016 MLS Cup penalty shootout, which the Sounders eventually won after six rounds, securing their first MLS Cup Title.

International career
Ivanschitz made his debut for Austria in a February 2003 friendly match against Greece, coming on as a substitute for Markus Weissenberger. He was also a participant at the UEFA Euro 2008. He has earned 69 caps for Austria and has scored 12 goals.

Career statistics

Club statistics

1.Includes Super League playoffs and MLS Cup playoffs.

International goals
Scores and results list Austria's goal tally first.

National team statistics

Honours

Club 
Rapid Wien
 Austrian Football Bundesliga: 2005

Seattle Sounders FC
 MLS Cup: 2016

Individual 
 Austrian Footballer of the Year: 2003

Personal life
Ivanschitz comes from a musical family and plays various musical instruments in his spare time. He is a part of the Burgenland Croat community.

References

External links

 
 
 

1983 births
Living people
People from Eisenstadt
Association football midfielders
Austrian footballers
Austrian expatriate footballers
Austria international footballers
Austrian people of Croatian descent
Austria youth international footballers
UEFA Euro 2008 players
SK Rapid Wien players
FC Red Bull Salzburg players
Panathinaikos F.C. players
1. FSV Mainz 05 players
Levante UD footballers
Seattle Sounders FC players
Austrian Football Bundesliga players
Super League Greece players
Bundesliga players
La Liga players
Major League Soccer players
Expatriate footballers in Greece
Expatriate footballers in Germany
Expatriate footballers in Spain
Expatriate soccer players in the United States
Burgenland Croats
Austrian expatriate sportspeople in Germany
Austrian expatriate sportspeople in Greece
Austrian expatriate sportspeople in Spain
Austrian expatriate sportspeople in the United States
FC Viktoria Plzeň players
Czech First League players
Expatriate footballers in the Czech Republic
Austrian expatriate sportspeople in the Czech Republic
Footballers from Burgenland